Mike Cheokas (born May 27, 1953) is an American politician from Georgia.

Education 
Cheokas earned a degree from Emory University and Pierce College.

Career 
Cheokas is a Republican member of the Georgia House of Representatives from the 138th District. He was first elected in 2004 and served until losing reelection in 2016 to Democrat Bill McGowan. McGowan did not seek a second term in 2018, but Cheokas ran again and won, defeating Bardin Hooks.

Personal life 
Cheokas' wife is Gaynor Cheokas. They have three children. Cheokas and his family live in Americus, Georgia.

References

Living people
Republican Party members of the Georgia House of Representatives
1953 births
People from Americus, Georgia
21st-century American politicians